Southern Discomfort is a collection of rarities by sludge metal band Eyehategod, released on January 25, 2000. The title is a reference to the alcoholic drink Southern Comfort. Tracks 1-6 are demos from the Take as Needed for Pain era that ended up on splits and singles. Tracks 7-9 are outtakes from the original Dopesick sessions. These tracks later appeared on the 2006 Century Media reissues of each album. Certain editions of this album feature a red skull on the cover instead of a white one.

Track listing
 "Ruptured Heart Theory" – 3:33
 "Story of the Eye" – 2:30
 "Blank/Shoplift" – 3:58
 "Southern Discomfort" – 4:25
 "Serving Time in the Middle of Nowhere" – 3:20
 "Lack of Almost Everything" – 2:28
 "Peace Thru War (Thru Peace and War)" – 1:48
 "Depress" – 4:06
 "Dopesick Jam" – 16:02

Personnel
Mike IX Williams – vocals
Brian Patton – lead guitar
Jimmy Bower – rhythm guitar
Mark Schultz – bass (tracks 1–6)
Vince LeBlanc – bass (tracks 7–9)
Joey LaCaze – drums

References

Eyehategod albums
2000 compilation albums